In Hindu theology, Arishadvarga or Shadripu/Shada Ripu (meaning the six enemies) are the six enemies of the mind, which are: Kama (desire),  krodha (anger), lobha (greed), Mada (Sense of I), moha (Attachment),  and matsarya (Partiality); the negative characteristics of which prevent man from attaining moksha.

Enemies of the true Self/Soul

These are the fundamental tenets of Kali Yuga . The more each individual fights them, the longer will be the life of Dharma in this yuga.

 Lust or desire for sensual pleasure –  – Kama
 Anger –  – Krodha
 Greed –  – Lobha
 Attachment  –  – Moha 
 Sense of I –  – Mada
 Partiality  –  – Matsarya

According to Hindu scriptures, these bind the soul to the cycle of birth and death and keep it confined in this material world (confines of Maya or relative existence). Especially the first three are said to pave the way towards hell. The first two bring about difficult experiences we face in our lives..  

The Mada or Ahankar, the false ego,  all our actions in the world are for selfish ends. Hence there is no other factor causing the illusory duality of differentiation between 'us' and 'them' and the repeated pain and delusion it entails than the psychological ego-sense. When the materially identified ego has sided with the materialistic forces of creation (Maya), it is said to have the following faults: kama, krodha, lobha, moha, mada and matsarya. Also called evil passions, man's spiritual heritage constantly gets looted by these internal thieves (and their numerous variations), causing him to lose knowledge of his True Being.

If a person is virtually a prisoner of arishadvargas (the six internal enemies), then his life is completely governed by destiny. As a person moves ahead on the path of Self-Realization, the grip of destiny over him loosens and he gets more and more leverage to change his destiny. When a person identifies himself with the Self, then he becomes part of the power of destiny. Merely his power of Sankalpa is good enough to materialize and change any situation either for good or bad according to his Sankalpa.

Doubt has positive and negative nature, this is the opposite of the nature of an object. According to Naiyayikas, knowledge is based on perception (anubhava), which is valid. But those based on remembrance (Smriti), doubt, error, and hypothetical argument are invalid. Similar unique or rare features in an object create doubt as to where its from and perhaps when exhibited from within a person's mind or from delusions, its validity. "Sometimes real and false create doubt or  doubt arises about the appearance of false as real." (See also Maya) Like any scene of a mirage, if it is perceived then it might not be real, but if it is not perceived it can be felt or experienced. "Unattainability of the truth of the real, as well as the unreal, creates doubt of its reality."

Understanding 
According to Hindu belief, without experiencing these Shadripu at the fullest a person cannot understand the meaning of the Love which is the soul. These enemies of mind pull the human from all the sides away from the soul and make the life of the human miserable. To overcome this misery every human needs to experience all these Shadripu's and understand the consequences which later teach the person the importance of love and divinity. A human who controls all these Shadripu's even at some of the extent later enjoy's the power of peace. 

A mind which is in delusion (Moha) ignores its inner consciousness (Ātman). As a result, it starts believing that its ego is its only existence. Such an ego-dependent mind, soon goes into a state of arrogance (Mada). And in an arrogant mind, personal desires (Kama) start flourishing. As the mind, fulfils some of its initial smaller desires, it keeps desiring more stuff to become greedy (Lobha). After sometime, at some point, it eventually fails to fulfil some of its bigger desires, and then the mind gets angry (Krodha). Finally the mind starts envying (Matsarya) others who have more stuff than it has.

See also 
 Five Thieves (Sikhism)
 Kashaya (Jainism)
 Kleshas (Hinduism)
 Kleshas (Buddhism)
 Matsarya
 Ahamkara

References

Further reading 

 Shankaracharyar Granthabali, Basumati publication (Kolkata: 1995), Volume 3

Hindu philosophical concepts
Hindu ethics